Constantine Doukas (died 30 May 1185), called Makrodoukas (Μακροδούκας, "Tall Doukas", probably a sobriquet) by Niketas Choniates, was a Byzantine nobleman.

Life 
Although a distinguished figure in the late Komnenian period, it is impossible to establish his family origin or his ties to the 11th-century Doukas dynasty. He is first attested in documents dating to 1166, where he already bears the high court rank of pansebastos sebastos and is related to the ruling dynasty by marriage with a daughter of the sebastokrator Isaac Komnenos and niece of the emperor Manuel I Komnenos (r. 1143–1180). Makrodoukas next appears in 1170 and 1176, when he accompanied Emperor Manuel I in his campaigns against the Seljuk Turks.

Under Andronikos I Komnenos (r. 1183–1185), Makrodoukas initially enjoyed the emperor's favour, and rose to the rank of panhypersebastos. However, after the rebellion of Makrodoukas' nephew Isaac Komnenos, who declared himself emperor in Cyprus, he was arrested along with other relatives of the rebel, accused of treason and condemned on 30 May to death by stoning. After surviving the stoning, he was dragged to Mangana, where he was dismembered.

Family 
Constantine Makrodoukas married Anna Komnene, daughter of Isaac Komnenos by 1166. They had at least one daughter, Zoe Doukaina, who married John Doukas.

References

Sources 
 

12th-century births
1185 deaths
12th-century Byzantine people
Executed Byzantine people
People executed by dismemberment
People executed for treason
Constantine
12th-century executions by the Byzantine Empire
Generals of Manuel I Komnenos
Panhypersebastoi
Sebastoi